Vernon Wright Lapham (born 31 August 1971) is a Zimbabwean windsurfer. He competed in the 1988 Summer Olympics.

References

1971 births
Living people
Zimbabwean male sailors (sport)
Zimbabwean windsurfers
Sailors at the 1988 Summer Olympics – Division II
Olympic sailors of Zimbabwe